Heer Ranjha is a 1932 Punjabi feature film, the first movie directed by A.R. Kardar, starring Anwari Begum and Rafiq Ghaznavi in the title roles. 

Based on the love story of Heer Ranjha and writings of the 18th-century poet Waris Shah. Rafiq Ghaznavi also composed the music for the film.

Production
Heer Ranjha was the first talkie film to be created in Punjab; it was produced by Hakim Ram Prasad and the Playart Photophone Company (formerly known as United Players Corporation, founded by Kardar). The film was censored by the Punjab Board.

References

External links

Punjabi-language Indian films
Punjabi-language Pakistani films
1932 films
Lollywood
Indian black-and-white films
1930s romance films
Films directed by A. R. Kardar
1930s Punjabi-language films
Indian romance films
Films based on Indian folklore
Heer Ranjha
Films based on poems